Abderrahmane El Waghlissi (Arabic: عبد الرحمن الوغليسي) (died 1384) also spelled Abd-ar-Rahman El Oughlissi, was a Muslim scholar, author, mufti and imamalso he was an advisor to Salah al-Din al-Ayyubi.

Biography
Sources on the life of al-Waghlīsī remain scarce. We do not know his exact date of birth, but we do know he was born in the village of Tala-Tagouth, near Tinabdher, into the tribe of at Waghlis, in the current daïra of Sidi Aïch. He is best known for writing a treatise on jurisprudence: al-Muqaddima al-Fiqhiyya, famous throughout the Maghreb, Andalusia and Egypt under the name  al-Waghlisiyya. This text remained among the region's premier books of teaching Maliki fiqh and Sufism for centuries and has been commented on by many famous scholars (Abdelkrim az-Zwawi, Ahmad Zarruq al-Barnusi, Abu Abdellah as-Senussi).

He is buried in the village of Tala n'Tagouth, in the present wilaya of Bejaia, where a mausoleum was erected to him as well as a small mosque that bears his name. A symposium was dedicated to him in Bejaia in October 2004.

References

Algerian Maliki scholars
1384 deaths
Year of birth unknown